Sangtam, also called Thukumi, Isachanure, or Lophomi, is a Naga language spoken in northeast India. It is spoken in Kiphire District and in the Longkhim-Chare circle in Tuensang district, Nagaland, India.

Dialects
Ethnologue lists the following dialects of Sangtam.

Kizare
Pirr (Northern Sangtam)
Phelongre
Thukumi (Central Sangtam)
Photsimi
Purr (Southern Sangtam)

The standardized dialect of Sangtam is based on the Tsadanger village speech variety.

Phonology
Sangtam is unusual in having two stops with bilabial trilled release, .

All phonemes with /t/ are dental

/ʈ/ is realised like /ʈʵ/

All vowels can have high, mid, or low tone

References

Ao languages
Languages of Nagaland
Endangered languages of India